The BYD S6 is a mid-size crossover SUV designed and manufactured by China's Shenzhen-based battery, photovoltaics, and car maker, BYD. It is also the brand's first crossover SUV product.

Background 
The BYD S6 was shown at the Guangzhou Auto Show in late 2010 and since May 6, 2011 when this model was first officially sold in Changsha, China. It became the best selling China domestic SUV in sales volume by reaching 15,000 units in December, 2011, being awarded as "Fastest Seller SUV" and has been named China's "SUV of the Year" according to the Annual Ranking of Chinese Automobiles.

There are two models of the BYD S6 available to public sales in China, the 2.0 L and 2.4 L, with eight versions featuring different trim and equipment levels.

In April 2012, BYD announced it would expand the warranty on all its products to four years or 100,000 km.

Safety 
In December 2012, the China Automobile Technology Research Center published the C-NCAP crash-testing impact scores of BYD S6, awarding it the highest five-star safety rating for an SUV. This designation makes the S6 the first Chinese domestic SUV model with this rating. In C-NCAP tests, the BYD S6 out-performed other brands in body structure, design, and safety device validation.

In November 2012, the upgraded model BYD S6 Jin Yue version was introduced equipped with the world's first intelligent watch key which is not just used to check the time, but also can achieve the identification, induction door, keyless entry, one-click startup. This is expected to help decrease the risk of vehicles stolen due to missing keys.

Design controversies 
The design of the BYD S6, S7, and later variants including the first generation BYD Tang is controversial as the side profile heavily resemble the second generation Lexus RX crossover SUV.

Global markets 
The BYD S6 has been exported to Ukraine, and Uruguay. It made its debut at 2012 Chile Show and was expected to begin sales in Chile from December, 2012. BYD S6 has also been produced in Iran and Karmania car factory since 2017.

References

External links 

 BYD

S6
Cars introduced in 2011